Robert Stadelmann (born 23 January 1972, in Marburg) is an Austrian nordic combined skier who competed during the 1990s. He won a bronze medal in the 4 x 5 km team event at the 1997 FIS Nordic World Ski Championships in Trondheim and finished 52nd in the 15 km individual at the 1999 championships.

Stadelmann's only individual career victory was in a World Cup event in Chamonix, France in 1999.

External links

1972 births
Austrian male Nordic combined skiers
Living people
Olympic Nordic combined skiers of Austria
Nordic combined skiers at the 1994 Winter Olympics
FIS Nordic World Ski Championships medalists in Nordic combined